Tom Tallitsch (born 1974) is an American jazz saxophonist. He is also a composer, music educator, piano teacher for students with autism, musical director for the Big Sky Project Dance Company, and jazz radio host. His most recent recording is All Together Now (Posi-Tone, 2015)

Tallitsch was born in Elmhurst, Illinois and raised in Westlake, Ohio. He attended Westlake High School and Bay Village High School, graduating in 1992. He attended the University of Cincinnati – College-Conservatory of Music (CCM), graduating in 1996. Tallitsch is married to Carrie Ellmore-Tallitsch, a professional dancer and former principal dancer with the Martha Graham Dance Company.

Performing
Tallitsch has performed as a jazz saxophonist for over 25 years (bandleader/composer and sideman) throughout the United States, Europe, and South America.  He performs regularly at concert venues and jazz clubs primarily in New York City including Birdland, the Sidedoor Jazz Club, Smalls, Fat Cat, Garage, Tomi Caffe Vivaldi, Shrine, 55 Bar, Something Jazz Club, Puppets, Smoke, New Jersey jazz venues including Trumpets, Shanghai Jazz, the West Windsor Arts Council, the Arts Council of Princeton, the Grounds For Sculpture and Philadelphia, Pennsylvania jazz venues like Ortleibs, Chris's Jazz Cafe, the Philadelphia Museum of Art, Zanzibar Blue, the Philadelphia Jazz Festival, and the Reading Jazz Festival. He has been the opening Jazz artist at the annual Pork Roll Festivals in Trenton, New Jersey. Tallitsch has been the host of The Modern Jazz Radio Show on the Mercer County Community College jazz station.

Compositions and recordings

Tallitsch has released six albums of original compositions including works on Posi-Tone Records and Origin Records. His fifth album for Posi-Tone, "All Together Now" was recorded in New York City in 2014 and released in April 2015. Tallitsch has published over 100 original jazz compositions and arrangements for small ensembles, which are regularly played on terrestrial and internet radio stations throughout the world, and by student jazz ensembles including Stony Brook University.

Tallitsch's compositions include improvisational, written, and recorded music for dance. His works have been used by dancers from the Martha Graham Dance Company at The Martha Graham Choreographer showcase "Lookout" 2000, choreographed by Carrie Ellmore-Tallitsch. Tallitsch is currently Musical Director, and Composer for the multi-media dance company, The Big Sky Project, founded by Carrie Ellmore-Tallitsch.

Teaching
Tallitsch currently tutors jazz saxophone students in Princeton, New Jersey and teaches piano students with autism at The Princeton Child Development Institute. In addition, Tallitsch has been involved with many grade school, high schools and colleges as a jazz educator, contributing to jazz clinics and lecture series in New Jersey at The Lawrenceville School, The Pennington School, Bay Village High School, Creative Music Studios and the Pine Cobble School. Tallitsch was the founding director of The Central NJ Homeschool Bands which offered home-schooled musicians an opportunity for creative group interaction with other musicians in an instrumental ensemble. Tallitsch has given advanced jazz instruction at Mercer County Community College, Westminster Choir College, Creative Music Studios, The Groove Academy, and Clef Club of Jazz and Performing Arts.

Discography
 Duality (2005)
 Perspective (2008)
 Medicine Man (2009 Origin/OA2)
 Heads or Tales (2012 Posi-Tone)
 All Together Now (Posi-Tone, 2015)

References
All Music 
Review of All Together Now at All About Jazz
Review of All Together Now at Something Else Reviews
Review of All Together Now at Step Tempest

External links
 RIDE CD Review – somethingelsereviews.com
 RIDE CD Review -jazzandblues.blogspot.com
 RIDE CD Review – criticaljazz.com

1974 births
Living people
American jazz saxophonists
American male saxophonists
Jazz musicians from Illinois
Musicians from Jersey City, New Jersey
Palmetto Records artists
Pew Fellows in the Arts
Posi-Tone Records artists
University of Cincinnati – College-Conservatory of Music alumni
21st-century American saxophonists
American male jazz musicians
21st-century American male musicians